FCF Co, Ltd. (FCF) is a privately held Taiwanese seafood conglomerate. They are the largest tuna trader in the world.

Overview
FCF is the largest tuna trader in the world. They are privately held. They are one of the largest integrated marine industry supply-chain service providers. They have more than 30 subsidiaries. FCF is an member of the Western Pacific Sustainable Tuna Alliance.

History
FCF was founded in 1972.

In 2019 FCF placed a stalking horse bid following the bankruptcy of Bumble Bee Foods, they already held a 25% stake in the company. In 2020 they successfully acquired Bumble Bee Foods.

A 2020 Greenpeace report linked FCF to illegal fishing and forced labor.

Facilities
FCF owns processing plants in Ghana and Papua New Guinea. Their fishing bases are mostly in Pacific Island Nations but they also have bases in Mauritius, Cape Town, South Africa, and Montevideo, Uruguay.

Organization
FCF has six main operational units:
 Information Technology and Administration 
 Longline
 Squid
 Purse Seine
 Finance
 Compliance Customers Response Management (CCRM)

See also
 List of companies of Taiwan
 Maritime industries of Taiwan
 Bolton Group
 Itochu
 True World Foods

References

Fishing industry in Taiwan
1972 establishments in Taiwan
Companies based in Kaohsiung
Fish processing companies
Seafood companies of Asia
Food and drink companies of Taiwan